Shar(r)on Levy may refer to:

Sharon Levy, swimmer
Sharron Levy, singer-songwriter
Sharon Osbourne, née Levy, music manager